Ricardo Chávez is a Mexican actor who has worked in theater, television and film. He was also a model and a ballet dancer before acting.

Early life and background
Ricardo Chávez was born in Mexico City on November 24, 1965, to a middle-class family. He is the youngest of three brothers. His father is an engineer and his mother is a housewife, and were both in the entertainment business before getting married. His father sang Mexican music and opened concerts for Pedro Infante and his mother worked as a model.

At the age of 16 when he was studying bachelor’s to become a Classical Dance Performer at the Instituto Nacional de Bellas Artes of México, Ricardo started working in theater.

Career
He then moved back to acting and started appearing in popular soap operas in Mexico, on the Hispanic network Televisa. After starring in nine soap operas on that network, Chávez moved to Brazil and played a lead role in the soap opera Vale Todo on Globo Network. Later, he went to Miami to play the lead role in the series On The Edge of the Law. Following this he played the lead role in the film Pretty Boy for which he won an award in "The Made in Miami Film Festival".

Ricardo Chávez has acted in 21 different plays including Who Is the Guilty One?, Andrés, Here Comes the Train, How To Forget My Past, Waiting for Godot, The Fiddler on the Roof with Manolo Fábregas among others.

Book
After 18 soap operas, 21 theater plays, 8 movies and over 100 television shows and series, Ricardo wrote Your Life Does Not Have To Be A Soap Opera, which was published simultaneously in English and Spanish in several continents.

Filmography

Movies

Television

Theater

References

External links 

Mexican male television actors
Male actors from Mexico City
Mexican male telenovela actors
1965 births
Mexican male film actors
Mexican male stage actors
Mexican male writers
Writers from Mexico City
Living people